Itzhak Gilboa (born February 3, 1963, in Tel Aviv) is an Israeli economist with contributions in decision theory. After obtaining his BA in Mathematics and Economics from Tel Aviv University, he earned his Ph.D. in 1987 under the supervision of David Schmeidler. He currently holds a visiting   professorship at Yale University and HEC Paris.

His work include the theory of Maxmin Expected Utility with David Schmeidler. This theory explains individual attitudes towards ambiguity that are consistent with the Ellsberg paradox.

Research and publications 
 I. Gilboa. Making Better Decisions: Decision Theory in Practice. Chichester, West Sussex: Wiley-Blackwell, 2011. .
 Ỉ. Gilboa Theory of decision under uncertainty	Cambridge ; New York : Cambridge University Press, 2009 
 N. Dimitri, M. Basili, and I. Gilboa, eds.. Cognitive Processes and Economic Behaviour. London: Routledge, 2003. 
 I. Gilboa, D. Schmeidler, A Theory of Case-Based Decisions Cambridge : Cambridge University Press, 2001.  Held in over 750 libraries according to WorldCat
Translated into Japanese as 決め方の科学 : 事例ベース意思決定理論 / Kimekata no kagaku : jirei bēsu ishi kettei riron 
 I. Gilboa, Rational Choice. 	Cambridge, Mass. : MIT Press, 2010.  Held in over 500 libraries according to WorldCat
I. Gilboa, L. Samuelson, Analogies and Theories: Formal Models of Reasoning (Lipsey Lectures) Oxford : Oxford University Press, 2001.

References

External links 
 Biography on the HEC Paris website
 Personal website
 

1963 births
Living people
People from Tel Aviv
Israeli economists
Tel Aviv University alumni
Northwestern University faculty
University of Pennsylvania faculty
Boston University faculty
Academic staff of Tel Aviv University
Fellows of the Econometric Society
Academic staff of HEC Paris